Corybas aconitiflorus, commonly known as the cradle orchid or spurred helmet orchid, is a species of terrestrial orchid endemic to eastern Australia, occurring from south-east Queensland to Tasmania. The small flowers have a hooded appearance as the uppermost sepal hides most of the rest of the flower. It is the type species of the genus Corybas.

Description 
Corybas aconitiflorus grows from a pair of small tubers, to which it dies down in the dormant season. The stems are short and upright, with generally a single flat, smooth, basal leaf. The labellum is much smaller than the petals and lateral sepals and is undivided, with its margins turned inwards. The thin column is wider at the base and has fused wings along its body. There are terminal persistent pollen masses (pollinia), cream in colour, fixed directly to the viscidia (sticky pads which adhere to pollinators). The flower is pollinated by fungus gnats but otherwise little is known about the pollination mechanism because the flower is hidden by the dorsal sepal and the species is difficult to cultivate.

Taxonomy 
Corybas aconitiflorus was first formally described by Richard Salisbury in The Paradisus Londinensis in 1807, where it was illustrated by William Hooker. This was also the source of the genus name Corybas. Both the genus name and the specific epithet refer to the shape of the flower. Corybas is derived from the Greek , a male dancer who worshipped the goddess Cybele, shown in illustrations wearing a crested helmet. The specific epithet aconitiflorus means "with a flower like Aconitum (monkshood)".

In 2002, David Jones, Mark Clements and others proposed splitting Corybas into eight smaller genera including Corybas, Anzybas, Corysanthes and Nematoceras. However, because  Corybas aconitiflorus is the type species of the genus, it will remain in Corybas.

Distribution and habitat
The cradle orchid grows in heath and forest, mostly in coastal and near coastal districts. It occurs in Queensland south from Gympie, in eastern New South Wales and in south-eastern Victoria with isolated populations in the west of the state. It also occurs in the north and east of Tasmania.

References 

aconitiflorus
Endemic orchids of Australia
Orchids of New South Wales
Orchids of Queensland
Orchids of Tasmania
Plants described in 1807